Husain al-Rahhal (1900–1971) was an Iraqi translator, journalist and Communist activist, who helped found the Iraqi Communist Party.

Al-Rahhal came from a family of officials and merchants. He is known as the first "marxist" student of Iraq. He travelled to Berlin in 1919 and India in 1921. He studied at the Baghdad School of Law, forming the first Marxist study circle in Iraq in 1924. The group published a newspaper, As-Sahifah, edited by Al-Rahhal.

References

1900 births
1971 deaths
Arab communists
Iraqi communists
Iraqi translators
Iraqi journalists
20th-century translators
20th-century journalists
Iraqi Communist Party politicians